CipherTrust was an anti-spam email software company based in Alpharetta, GA (a suburb of Atlanta), although they had offices around the world. The company was co-founded by Jay Chaudhry and Lawrence Hughes (both formerly with SecureIT). Chaudhry was CEO and Chairman of the Board of SecureIT until it was acquired by VeriSign in August 1998.

Since August 2006 it is part of Secure Computing Corp for 273.6 M$ (2006 USD), which was subsequently acquired by McAfee in 2008.

Products
Their main product is the IronMail, a gateway appliance that prevents leaks from outgoing transfers through the e-mail applications whether they be HTTP or FTP transfers. CipherTrust is the current market leader in the e-mail security space according to Gartner and other industry analysts. CipherTrust has recently added a new product to secure Instant Messaging called IronIM. Their CTO, Paul Judge, chaired the Anti-Spam Research Group (ASRG) of the IRTF. One of the services provided by CipherTrust is tracking of Zombie computers, which are a primary source of spam.

One of the innovations by the company was the invention of TrustedSource reputation system that provides reputation scores for Internet identities, such as IP addresses, URLs, domains, and email/web content.  This technology became an integral part of all of CipherTrust's products and one of the main reasons for its eventual buy-out.

Acquisition by Secure Computing
In August 2006, Secure Computing Corp. bought CipherTrust shares for 273.6 M$ (2006 USD). In this purchase, the merged companies would still offer their exclusive technologies.

References

External links 
 CipherTrust, Inc.
 TrustedSource

Software companies based in Georgia (U.S. state)
Defunct software companies of the United States